Hamari Betiyoon Ka Vivaah (English: Our Daughters' Wedding) is a Hindi television drama series that aired on Zee TV channel starting 21 April 2008 until 20 February 2009. The series has a Punjabi backdrop, and the story is about a mother's inherent anxiety about finding a suitable match for her daughters.

Cast 
 Raju Kher as Kulbhushan Kohli
 Himani Shivpuri as Kulraj Kulbhushan Kohli
 Sonali Suryavanshi as Sujata Kohli / Trivedi
 Pariva Pranati as Trishna Kohli / Trishna Rajdeep Malhotra 
 Shalini Chandran as Tanya Kohli / Malhotra 
 Roopal Tyagi as Manshaa Kohli
 Gautam Sharma as Raghav Trivedi
 Vikas Sethi / Sanjeet Bedi as Rajdeep Malhotra
 Omar Vani as Yuvraj / Raj Malhotra
 Jitendra Trehan as Mr. Trivedi
 Anju Mahendru as Nupur Malhotra
 Priya Ahuja as Sanjana Malhotra
 Hrishikesh Pandey as Shakti
 Kavita Rathod as Dimple
 Puneet Vashisht as Kanhaiya
 Nisha Sareen as Aarti Kapoor

External links
Official Website

Indian television soap operas
Zee TV original programming
2008 Indian television series debuts
2009 Indian television series endings